Steven Stadelman (born October 30, 1960) is an American politician and former television journalist who has been a Democratic member of the Illinois Senate since 2013, representing the 34th district. The district is based in Winnebago County and includes all or part of the municipalities of Rockford, Machesney Park, Loves Park and Cherry Valley.

Background
Stadelman is a graduate of the University of Wisconsin-Madison, where he studied journalism. He was a TV reporter and anchor in the Rockford area for two decades.

State Senate

2012 election
Stadelman was endorsed by former Rockford Board of Education President Nancy Kalchbrenner and former mayors Charles Box and Doug Scott.

Steve Stadelman defeated Winnebago County Board Member Frank Gambino to become senator for the new 34th district.

Tenure
In the Illinois General Assembly Stadelman's associated representatives are Democrat Maurice West in State House District 67 and Republican John Cabello in State House District 68.

As of July 2022, Senator Stadelman is a member of the following Illinois Senate committees:

 Appropriations - General Services Committee (SAPP-SAGS)
 Appropriations - Emergency Management Committee (SAPP-SAEM(
 Commerce Committee (SCOM)
 Credits, Deduction, and Exemptions Committee (SREV-SRCD)
 Higher Education Committee (SCHE)
 (Chairman of) Local Government Committee (SLGV)
 (Chairman of) Redistricting - Northern Illinois Committee (SRED-SRNI)
 Revenue Committee (SREV)
 (Chairman of) Revenue - Special Issues Committee (SREV-SRSI)
 Tourism and Hospitality Committee (STOU)
 Transportation Committee (STRN)

References

External links
 
 Biography, bills and committees at the 98th Illinois General Assembly
 By session: 98th

1960 births
20th-century American journalists
21st-century American journalists
21st-century American politicians
American television news anchors
Democratic Party Illinois state senators
Journalists from Illinois
Living people
Politicians from Rockford, Illinois
University of Wisconsin–Madison School of Journalism & Mass Communication alumni